Alex Sexton (born 3 December 1993) is a professional Australian rules footballer who plays for the Gold Coast Football Club in the Australian Football League (AFL)

Early life
Sexton was born in Melbourne attending St Monica's College, Epping. Sexton and his family moved to Logan, Queensland in his teens where he attended Chisholm Catholic College. He played junior football for the Keon Park Stars when he was in Melbourne then the Springwood Pumas before making his NEAFL debut for the Gold Coast Suns' reserves team in 2011. A Queensland representative at both U16 and U18 levels, Sexton was awarded the Alan McLean Medal as the division two best and fairest as well as QLD's MVP award at the 2010 NAB Australian U16 Championships. He was drafted by the Gold Coast Suns as a zone selection with pick 88 in the 2011 AFL draft.

AFL career
Sexton joined the Suns for his first preseason training camp in Arizona as a 17-year-old. His breakout season came in 2018 when he played all 22 AFL games for the Suns and was the leading goalkicker for the club that season.

Statistics
 Statistics are correct to the end of round 2, 2022

|-
|- style="background-color: #EAEAEA"
! scope="row" style="text-align:center" | 2012
|style="text-align:center;"|
| 37 || 6 || 1 || 1 || 38 || 12 || 50 || 18 || 10 || 0.2 || 0.2 || 6.3 || 2.0 || 8.3 || 3.0 || 1.7 || 0
|-
! scope="row" style="text-align:center" | 2013
|style="text-align:center;"|
| 6 || 4 || 3 || 4 || 20 || 8 || 28 || 7 || 8 || 0.8 || 1.0 || 5.0 || 2.0 || 7.0 || 1.8 || 2.0 || 0
|- style="background-color: #EAEAEA"
! scope="row" style="text-align:center" | 2014
|style="text-align:center;"|
| 6 || 14 || 6 || 7 || 73 || 48 || 121 || 25 || 26 || 0.4 || 0.5 || 5.2 || 3.4 || 8.6 || 1.8 || 1.9 || 0
|-
! scope="row" style="text-align:center" | 2015
|style="text-align:center;"|
| 6 || 13 || 8 || 3 || 102 || 44 || 146 || 32 || 29 || 0.6 || 0.2 || 7.8 || 3.4 || 11.2 || 2.5 || 2.2 || 0
|- style="background-color: #EAEAEA"
! scope="row" style="text-align:center" | 2016
|style="text-align:center;"|
| 6 || 18 || 13 || 8 || 179 || 105 || 284 || 58 || 47 || 0.7 || 0.4 || 9.9 || 5.8 || 15.8 || 3.2 || 2.6 || 0
|-
! scope="row" style="text-align:center" | 2017
|style="text-align:center;"|
| 6 || 20 || 12 || 7 || 198 || 116 || 314 || 93 || 28 || 0.6 || 0.4 || 9.9 || 5.8 || 15.7 || 4.7 || 1.4 || 0
|- style="background-color: #EAEAEA"
! scope="row" style="text-align:center" | 2018
|style="text-align:center;"|
| 6 || 22 || 28 || 19 || 202 || 98 || 300 || 72 || 51 || 1.3 || 0.9 || 9.2 || 4.5 || 13.6 || 3.3 || 2.3 || 1
|-
! scope="row" style="text-align:center" | 2019
|style="text-align:center;"|
| 6 || 22 || 39 || 29 || 187 || 65 || 252 || 72 || 42 || 1.8 || 1.3 || 8.5 || 3.0 || 11.5 || 3.3 || 1.9 || 0
|- style="background-color: #EAEAEA"
! scope="row" style="text-align:center" | 2020
|style="text-align:center;"|
| 6 || 14 || 19 || 12 || 103 || 28 || 131 || 44 || 22 || 1.4 || 0.9 || 7.4 || 2.0 || 9.4 || 3.1 || 1.6 || 1
|-
! scope="row" style="text-align:center" | 2021
|style="text-align:center;"|
| 6 || 21 || 21 || 14 || 167 || 50 || 217 || 87 || 23 || 1.0 || 0.7 || 8.0 || 2.4 || 10.3 || 4.1 || 1.1 || 0
|- style="background-color: #EAEAEA"
! scope="row" style="text-align:center" | 2022
|style="text-align:center;"|
| 6 || 2 || 0 || 1 || 1 || 2 || 3 || 0 || 1 || 0.0 || 0.5 || 0.5 || 1.0 || 1.5 || 0.0 || 0.5 || TBA
|-
|- class="sortbottom"
! colspan=3| Career
! 156
! 150
! 105
! 1270
! 576
! 1846
! 508
! 287
! 1.0
! 0.7
! 8.1
! 3.7
! 11.8
! 3.3
! 1.8
! 2
|}

Notes

References

External links

1993 births
Living people
Gold Coast Football Club players
Sportspeople from Logan, Queensland
Australian rules footballers from Queensland
Redland Football Club players